Osler may refer to:

A. Follett Osler (1808–1903), Birmingham meteorologist and chronologist
Bennie Osler (1901–1962), South African rugby union footballer
Several notable members of the Osler family of Canada, including:
Britton Bath Osler (1839–1901), Canadian lawyer and prosecutor
Sir Edmund Boyd Osler (Ontario politician) (1845–1924), Ontario politician and railway businessman
Edmund Boyd Osler (Manitoba politician) (1919–1987), Manitoba politician
Sir William Osler (1849–1919), physician and founding professor at Johns Hopkins Hospital
Osler, Hoskin & Harcourt, a Canadian law firm founded by Britton Bath Osler
Osler, Saskatchewan, a town in Saskatchewan, Canada, named after Edmund Boyd Osler
Malcolm Osler, a World War II South African flying ace

In medicine
Hereditary hemorrhagic telangiectasia, or Osler's disease, named for Sir William Osler
Osler's nodes, painful, red, raised lesions found on the hands and feet